Marshall W. Van Alstyne (born March 28, 1962) is a professor at Boston University and research associate at the MIT Initiative on the Digital Economy. He co-developed the theory of two-sided markets with Geoffrey G Parker. His work focuses on the economics of information. This includes a sustained interest in information markets and in how information and technology affect productivity with a new emphasis on “platforms” as an extension of the work on two-sided markets.

Early life and education 
Marshall Van Alstyne was born in Columbus, Ohio. He received a B.A. in Computer Science from Yale University  in 1984. He then moved to Software Systems Developer role at Martin Marietta Data Systems in Colorado and later Associate Staff at MIT Lincoln Laboratory in Massachusetts, before starting his M.S. and Doctorate programs. He obtained his MS in Management in 1991 and Ph.D. in Information Systems and Economics in 1998, both at the MIT Sloan School of Management.

Career 
Alstyne is a professor at Boston University and research associate at the MIT Initiative on the Digital Economy. Marshall co-organizes and co-chairs the annual MIT Platform Strategy Summit, an executive meeting on platform-centered economics and management, and he organizes and co-chairs  the Platform Strategy Research Symposium, the premier conference on Platform research.

After finishing his PhD, he joined as an assistant professor at the University of Michigan, and later joined Boston University in 2004.

Publications 
He is the co-author of Platform Revolution: How Networked Markets Are Transforming the Economy and How to Make Them Work for You. The book describes the information technologies, standards, and rules that make up platforms, and are used and developed by the biggest and most innovative global companies. Forbes included it among 16 must-read business books for 2016, describing it as "a practical guide to the new business model that is transforming the way we work and live."

Awards 
 National Science Foundation Faculty Career Award (1999)
 Thinkers 50 Digital Thinking Award (2019) – Ranked #36 among management scholars globally
 INFORMS Practical Impact Award (2020) – For research with real world impact 
 Thinkers 50 Digital Thinking Award (2021) – Award shared with Geoff Parker

Personal 
He is the son of constitutional law scholar William Van Alstyne.

References

External links 
 Homepage

MIT Sloan School of Management alumni
Living people
Yale University alumni
Boston University faculty
University of Michigan faculty
1962 births
Information systems researchers